The 1928 Boston College Eagles football team represented Boston College as an independent during the 1928 college football season. Led by first-year head coach Joe McKenney, Boston College compiled a perfect record of 9–0.

Schedule

References

Boston College
Boston College Eagles football seasons
College football undefeated seasons
Boston College Eagles football
1920s in Boston